Şüvəlan is a settlement and municipality in Baku, Azerbaijan.  It has a population of 14,992. The population origin comes mostly from a settlement of Qala, Azerbaijan.

History 
According to the old generation, an ancient times people in Qala, used Shuvalan as pasture for the animals. Then later on they moved to Shuvalan because the vegetation potential and due to cold weather in winter times in Qala.

Notable natives 
 Ruhulla Akhundov — First Secretary of the Communist Party of Azerbaijan SSR (1925–1926),  People's Commissar of Education of Azerbaijan SSR.
Almas Ildyrym
Ashraf Ashrafzade-Musician

See also 
Qala, Azerbaijan
Shuvalan FK

References 

Populated places in Baku